Vital Remains is an American death metal band from Providence, Rhode Island, formed in 1988.

History

Formation and early years
Guitarist Paul Flynn formed Vital Remains in 1988. Vital Remains' first line-up included Paul Flynn on lead guitar, Butch Machado on rhythm guitar, vocalist Mike Flynn, bassist Tom Supkow and drummer Chris Dupont. Mike Flynn is credited with coining the band's name. Paul soon revamped the band with musicians that fit his vision, and added Tony Lazaro and vocalist Jeff Gruslin to the line-up. Lazaro and Flynn shared the song writing duties, and released a pair of demos (1989's Reduced to Ashes and 1990's Excruciating Pain). The band secured a contract with French label Thrash Records, and released the single "The Black Mass" in 1991. Shortly after the release, the band signed to Peaceville's subsidiary label, Deaf Records. Vital Remains released Let Us Pray in 1992, as well as Into Cold Darkness in 1995. However, the band requested contract dissolution with Deaf Records, citing poor distribution, and a lack of promotion. In 1996, Dave Suzuki joined the band, initially playing drums. Suzuki eventually contributed guitar work, as the band worked on their next album. In mid 1997, Vital Remains signed a two-album deal with Osmose Records. Paul Flynn left the band, citing family obligations. The band released Forever Underground in 1997. Chris Ross from Cape Cod joined the band as the vocalist and Metal Maniacs said "that no band on the planet put on a headbanging show of satanic fury than Vital Remains." The band released Dawn of the Apocalypse in 2000, which featured vocalist Thorn. The album debuted a new, heavier style. Thorn quit the band in 1999.

Glen Benton era
In 2003, Glen Benton, vocalist/bassist of Deicide joined Vital Remains as a session vocalist for Vital Remains' fifth album, Dechristianize. The album received critical acclaim, and the band toured in-between Deicide's touring schedule. The band followed up with Icons of Evil in 2007, which also featured Glen Benton as a session vocalist and continued the same musical style as Dechristianize. Vital Remains also released their first live DVD, Evil-Death-Live, through Polish label Metal Mind Productions. Dave Suzuki left the band, shortly after the release of Icons of Evil.

Recent activity and vocalists' deaths
Vital Remains toured extensively for several years following the release of Icons of Evil, experiencing many lineup changes throughout the years. In several interviews between 2012 and 2014, Tony claimed that the band had "two albums worth of material."

In late 2014 and early 2015, the band added drummer James Payne (ex Hour of Penance), and Toronto-based Dean Arnold (of Primal Frost) as lead guitarist. Vital Remains toured South America, Europe and the United States in 2015. In November 2015, a Sanford Florida police officer was fired for singing "Let the Killing Begin" with the band, while he was on duty and in uniform. A video posted on YouTube shows Officer Andrew Ricks - in full uniform - making 'devil's horns' gesture and roaring the title words to the song.

Three of the band's former vocalists died between 2017 and 2018. On July 4, 2017, Chris Ross was fatally shot by his brother-in-law, James Ball. On November 2, 2017, Scott Wiley was reported dead with no cause of death revealed, followed by Jake Raymond on June 25, 2018.

On September 2, 2019, Brian Werner announced his decision to leave Vital Remains via his social media channels. The announcement was confirmed by the band on their Facebook and also opened an audition call for a live vocalist to join the band in their upcoming U.S. winter tour, and also stated their intention to finish and release their long-awaited seventh studio album in 2020; as of September 2021, however, the album has not been released.

On October 31, 2019, the band announced on their Facebook that Scott Eames would be the band's new lead vocalist for their 30th anniversary tour.

Style
Vital Remains earlier work had minor use of keyboards and ambient noise. After Forever Underground, they removed those elements for a purely death metal approach. Elements of their music that distinguish them in their genre are the use of acoustic Spanish-style solos and their construction of very long songs, which is uncommon in the majority of death metal music. Many of the songs on more recent releases approach eight or nine minutes in length. With the addition of Dave Suzuki to the band, the lead guitar work took a much more prominent place within song structure. He also chose to employ a neoclassical style of soloing.

Band members

Current members
Tony Lazaro – rhythm guitar (1988–present)
Gaeton "Gator" Collier – bass, backing vocals (2008–present)

Former members 
Paul Flynn – lead guitar (1988–1996)
Tom Supkow – bass (1988–1989)
Chris Dupont – drums (1988–1990)
Jeff Gruslin – lead vocals (1988–1995)
Ace Alonzo – drums (1990–1994)
Joseph "Joe" Lewis – bass (1990–2000), lead vocals (1996–1999)
Rick Corbett – drums (1994–1995)
Dave Suzuki – lead guitar, drums (1997–2007), bass (2000–2007)
"Thorn" – lead vocals (1999)
Glen Benton – lead vocals (2003–2008)

Timeline

Discography

Studio albums 
Let Us Pray (1992)
Into Cold Darkness (1995)
Forever Underground (1997)
Dawn of the Apocalypse (2000)
Dechristianize (2003)
Icons of Evil (2007)

Video albums 
Evil Death Live (2007)

EPs 
The Black Mass (1991)

Compilation albums 
Horrors of Hell (2006)

Demos 
Reduced to Ashes (1989)
Excruciating Pain (1990)

Notes

References

External links

Vital Remains on Myspace
Scott Wily of Vital Remains interviewed on metalrulesradio.com

American death metal musical groups
Heavy metal musical groups from Rhode Island
Musical groups established in 1988
Century Media Records artists
Musical quintets